The Syrian Free Press is a non-profit news organization that covers the latest events in Syria. It was created in early 2011 to support the 2011 Syrian uprising. The organization interface is in Arabic but it covers some news in English.

History
The organization was formed by a coalition of many Syrian human rights activists and professionals from different specializations solely to support the uprising of Syrian people since mid February.

Goals
 "Provide a clear picture on the current Syrian events."
 "Communicate on larger scale with many opposition groups to support Syrian people protests."
 "Document the criminal acts of Syrian government against its people with support of different human right activists and groups."

Political views
Syrian Free Press does support "the freedom of expression which is the foundation of its organization". It is aiming to "achieve a real democratic system in Syria which will guarantee all Syrian people equal rights and prevent the misuse and abuse of power".

Media coverage
 Many videos released by the organization are published by mainstream media stations, such as Al Jazeera, CNN and France24.
 EAWV
 TGCOM
 Dradio DE interview

References 

 In German: Social Media Revolution!, Svenja Siegert, Journalist Online
 In German: Videos zeigen angeblich die Brutalität des syrischen Regimes (Videos allegedly show the brutality of the Syrian regime), from January Derrer, 2011-06-15

External links
 Official website

2011 in Syria
2012 in Syria
Human rights organizations based in Syria
News agencies based in Syria
Organizations of the Syrian civil war